Zhashan Subdistrict is a subdistrict in Caidian District, Wuhan, Hubei, China.

History
In 1949, Zhashan was part of Hanyang First District. In 1950 it was part of Sixth District. In 1951 & 1955 it was part of Seventh District. In 1956, the area was named Zhashan Leadership Group. In 1958 it was part of Chaoyang Commune. In 1961, it was part if Daji District. In 1975, Yong'an District Xinmin Commune, Daji District Xinhua Commune and Zhashan Commune were combined into Zhashan Commune. In March 1984, Zhashan was made into a township and in December 1984, it was made into a town. In June 2000, Zhashan was made into a subdistrict.

Administrative divisions
Four communities:
 Zhashan Community, Zhashanxin, Xingguang, Dadong Community

Thirty-seven villages:
 Dadong Village, Xiaodong, Hongyan, Xingguang, Lianyi, Lianmeng, Qiulin, Laoshichen, Luosigang, Sanhong, Tanshu, Zhongyuan, Changxin, Xiaguang, Qianfeng, Shuangfeng, Zhashan Village, Conglin, Xin'anbu, Liuhuan, Yuanling, Qunyan, Dingjiu, Yizhi, Fanli, Luojia, Chenjia, Zhujia, Xinsheng, Sanjiadian, Sanyang, Minsheng, Xingli, Xinji, You'ai, Qunjian, Jinniu

References

Geography of Wuhan
Township-level divisions of Hubei
Subdistricts of the People's Republic of China